Life is Beautiful (Zivot je lep) is a 1985 Yugoslav drama film directed by Boro Drašković.

Cast 
 Rade Šerbedžija - Vito
 Dragan Nikolić - Gara
 Sonja Savić - Singer
 Pavle Vuisić - Kruscic
 Ljubiša Samardžić - Valentino
 Predrag Laković - Masinovodja
 Ivan Bekjarev - Guitarist 
 Tihomir Pleskonjić - Trumpeter
 Milan Puzić - Gospodin
 Milan Erak - Chauffeur
 Stevan Gardinovački - Koljac peradi
 Snežana Savić - Konobarica
 Bata Živojinović - Visoko pozicionirani drug

External links 

1985 drama films
1985 films
Yugoslav drama films
Films set in Yugoslavia